South St. Paul Municipal Airport , also known as Richard E. Fleming Field or simply Fleming Field, is a city-owned public-use airport located two miles (3 km) south of the central business district of South St. Paul, a city in Dakota County, Minnesota, United States. It is named for Richard E. Fleming, a United States Marine Corps Naval Aviator during World War II who was posthumously awarded a Medal of Honor. It is the only reliever airport for Minneapolis–St. Paul International Airport that is not operated by the Metropolitan Airports Commission.

Although most U.S. airports use the same three-letter location identifier for the FAA and IATA, South St. Paul Municipal Airport is assigned SGS by the FAA but has no designation from the IATA.

Over the decade of 1950 and 1960 the airport was the main launch center for Winzen Research Inc. One of the most important companies devoted to the construction and operation of stratospheric balloons. The proximity to their headquarters in Minneapolis, made the ideal place for testing of new balloon models, as well as for technological flights and a number of scientific experiments.

In 1957, Fleming Field was the site chosen to launch the first manned flight of the MANHIGH program of the Air Force, commanded by Lieutenant Joseph Kittinger. According to our records the latest balloons flights from there dating from the mid 60's.

Currently, inside the installations of the airport, there is an important museum with a very prominent collection of WWII aircraft.

Facilities and aircraft 
For the 12-month period ending May 31, 2016, the airport had 51,000 general aviation aircraft operations, an average of 140 per day. In January 2017, there were 401 aircraft based at this airport: 375 single-engine, 20 multi-engine and 6 helicopter.

References

External links 
 South Saint Paul Fleming Field, official web site
  

Airports in Minnesota
Buildings and structures in Dakota County, Minnesota
Transportation in Dakota County, Minnesota